(Y)erukala or (Y)erukula may refer to:

 Yerukala language, a Dravidian language of India
 Yerukala people, a local name for the Koravar people of South India